Narzullo Naimovich Oblomuradov (born 22 January 1975) is an Uzbekistan politician and scientist who is serving as the leader of the Ecological Party of Uzbekistan since 1 February 2021. Since 30 December 2021, he is the Chairman of the State Committee of the Republic of Uzbekistan on Ecology and Environmental Protection (Minister of Ecology). He was the Ecological Party's presidential candidate in 2021 presidential elections. He got 4.1%.

Biography 
Oblomuradov was born in the Urgut District of Samarqand Region to a family of teachers. He attended the University of World Economy and Diplomacy in Tashkent where graduated in 1996. From there, Oblomuradov continued his studies by living abroad in the United Kingdom. In 2000, he completed two year master course in International Economics from Birmingham University. He is a scientist-economist, PhD in Economics, and an associate professor.

From 2000, he worked in the higher education system of Uzbekistan, particularly in the Tashkent Financial Institute and Tashkent Textile and Light Industry Institute, where he served as the head of the chair, the dean of the department, and a researcher. He also worked in the banking, financial and government sectors.

In April 2020, Oblomuradov was appointed First Deputy Chairman of the State Committee on Ecology and Environmental Protection of Uzbekistan. On 1 February 2021, he was elected to a chairman post of the Executive Committee of the Central Council (Leader) for the Ecological Party of Uzbekistan. As the leader of the party, he succeeded Komiljon Tojiboev, whom had prior led the party from November 2020. He was the first presidential candidate nominated in 2021 presidential elections in Uzbekistan.

December 30, 2021 appointed Chairman of the State Committee for Ecology and Environmental Protection of the Republic of Uzbekistan.

Personal life 
In addition to Uzbek, Oblomuradov speaks fluent English and Russian. He is married and has three children.

References

External links 
 Биография на официальном сайте Экологической партии Узбекистана (in Russian)

Bibliography 
 Муйнокка мадад (Help Muynak)
 Дарахт экинг (Plant trees)

Living people
Uzbekistani politicians
Uzbekistani economists
Alumni of the University of Birmingham
1975 births
People from Samarqand Region
Leaders of political parties in Uzbekistan
Uzbekistani environmentalists